Laurien Magee (c. 1689, Islandmagee, Ireland – 1710, Islandmagee, Ireland), was an alleged witch and one of the eight supposed victims put to death during the Islandmagee Witch trial.

Witch trial
Laurien Magee was one of the eight women that Mary Dunbar claimed were the witches that had attacked her in spectral form. Laurien was found guilty of Witchcraft as the other seven women were.

Records during this time were lost during the Irish Civil War when the Public Records Office were burned, because of this exact records of what happened to Mary Dunbar and the eight women convicted were lost.

See also 
Islandmagee Witch Trial
Florence Newton
Alice Kyteler

References 

1689 births
1710 deaths
People executed for witchcraft
18th-century Irish women